Jack Mills (1920-1982) was a footballer who played as a full back in the Football League for Chester. He subsequently played for Altrincham F.C.

References

Chester City F.C. players
Altrincham F.C. players
Association football fullbacks
English Football League players
1920 births
1982 deaths
Welsh footballers
Sportspeople from Flintshire